Holiya (Golari) is a southern Dravidian language closely related to Kannada.

It was spoken by about 3,614 persons in Nagpur and Bhandara districts of Maharashtra (Vidarbha) and Seoni and Balaghat districts of Madhya Pradesh as per 1901 census.

References

Kannada language